Carica-Tours was a weekly half-hour Canadian television series hosted by artist Jack Der who illustrated story tours of different countries. The show was broadcast from Montreal.

External links
 Queen's University Directory of CBC Television Series (Carica-Tours archived listing link via archive.org)
 Carica-Tours at TVArchive.ca

1952 Canadian television series debuts
1952 Canadian television series endings
CBC Television original programming
1950s Canadian children's television series
Black-and-white Canadian television shows